Hətəmlər or Khatamla or Khatamlar or Khatamalar may refer to:
Hətəmlər, Lachin, Azerbaijan
Hətəmlər, Tovuz, Azerbaijan